Woo Sang-hyeok (born 23 April 1996) is a South Korean athlete specialising in the high jump. He represented South Korea at the 2016 and 2020 Summer Olympics, finished fourth in Tokyo.

He became World Indoor Champion at the 2022 World Athletics Indoor Championships.

His personal bests in the event are 2.35 metres outdoors (Tokyo 2021 and Eugene 2022) and 2.36 metres indoors (Hustopeče 2022).

International competitions

References

1996 births
Living people
South Korean male high jumpers
Olympic athletes of South Korea
Athletes (track and field) at the 2016 Summer Olympics
Athletes (track and field) at the 2020 Summer Olympics
Athletes (track and field) at the 2014 Asian Games
Athletes (track and field) at the 2018 Asian Games
Asian Games medalists in athletics (track and field)
Asian Games silver medalists for South Korea
Medalists at the 2018 Asian Games
Competitors at the 2015 Summer Universiade
Competitors at the 2017 Summer Universiade
World Athletics Indoor Championships winners
Sportspeople from Daejeon
20th-century South Korean people
21st-century South Korean people